Stuart Gwyn Jones  (15 July 1925 – 18 July 2012) was a leading amateur golfer from New Zealand.

Golf career
Jones won the New Zealand Amateur seven times between 1955 and 1971. He also won the Canadian Amateur Championship in 1967, beating fellow New Zealander Ross Murray in the final, the two being part of the New Zealand team that had just competed in the Commonwealth Tournament. Jones was runner-up in the 1970 Spanish International Amateur Championship. He also won two professional tournaments in New Zealand, the 1965 Wattie's Tournament and the 1970 Spalding Masters. In 1955 he was runner-up to Peter Thomson in the Wiseman's Tournament.

Jones represented New Zealand at international level from 1953 to 1975. He played in the Eisenhower Trophy seven times between 1958 and 1972. He played in all six Commonwealth Tournament matches and also eight times against Australia in the Sloan Morpeth Trophy.

Personal life
Jones was appointed a Member of the Order of the British Empire, for services to golf, in the 1977 New Year Honours. He is a member of the New Zealand Sports Hall of Fame and the New Zealand Golf Hall of Fame.

Tournament wins
1955 New Zealand Amateur
1959 New Zealand Amateur
1961 New Zealand Amateur
1962 New Zealand Amateur
1964 New Zealand Amateur
1965 Wattie's Tournament
1966 New Zealand Amateur
1967 Canadian Amateur Championship
1970 Spalding Masters
1971 New Zealand Amateur

Team appearances
Commonwealth Tournament (representing New Zealand): 1954, 1959, 1963, 1967 (tied), 1971, 1975
Eisenhower Trophy (representing New Zealand): 1958, 1960, 1962, 1964, 1966, 1970, 1972
Sloan Morpeth Trophy (representing New Zealand): 1953, 1956, 1961 (winners), 1964, 1965 (winners), 1966, 1967, 1969

References 

New Zealand male golfers
Amateur golfers
Sportspeople from Hastings, New Zealand
New Zealand Members of the Order of the British Empire
1925 births
2012 deaths